PYG may refer to:

PYG, the IATA code for Pakyong Airport, a greenfield RCS airport in Pakyong, India
 Paraguayan guaraní, currency by ISO 4217 currency code
PYG, the National Rail code for Paisley Gilmour Street railway station, Renfrewshire, Scotland
PYG (band), a defunct Japanese rock music group